The Subaru Ascent is a mid-size crossover SUV with three-row seating produced by Subaru. In some markets, it is sold as the Subaru Evoltis. It is the largest automobile Subaru manufactures. The seven or eight-seat passenger SUV, with the design based on the VIZIV-7 concept, made its debut at the LA Auto Show on November 28, 2017. The Ascent became available in the third quarter of 2018. Like its American-built predecessor, the Tribeca, the Ascent is not available in Japan.

History 

The Ascent was originally introduced as a concept car at the 2017 New York International Auto Show in April, where it was also announced that Subaru would be producing the vehicle at its Lafayette, Indiana Subaru of Indiana Assembly Plant. Production began in late 2017 alongside the current Subaru Impreza. It was to be the flagship Subaru vehicle in North America, and replace the Subaru Tribeca (previously the B9 Tribeca), which was discontinued after the 2014 model year. Subaru Japan had their own three-row crossover called the Subaru Exiga that was available from 2008 until its discontinuation in 2018. In terms of exterior design, it was akin to a 3-row Outback as is the Ascent to the Forester.

The first spy photographs of Subaru Ascent development mules surfaced in late summer 2016. Although the Ascent was spotted testing in 2017 with an expected mid-2017 on-market date, the sale date was pushed back to early summer 2018.

Subaru initially announced the Ascent would be sold in the Philippines as the Evoltis starting from 2020. Its release was delayed numerous times owing to the COVID-19 pandemic, and eventually was introduced in the Philippines in May 2021. Only the Touring model is available. The Evoltis name is also used in Israel and several South American markets. Although some sources reported the Evoltis name would be used for the first battery electric vehicle sold by Subaru, that vehicle, which was co-developed with Toyota, was announced in September 2021 as the Subaru Solterra instead.

Stop-sale recall 
In August 2018, Subaru recalled (at least) 293 vehicles that were thought to have faulty spot welds. Due to the complexity of fixing such a problem, the company said it would instead provide owners with new vehicles. Most were still in dealer inventory; only nine had been sold. However, after physical inspection all 293 vehicles were correctly welded and cleared for service.

Design 

The Ascent is built on the Subaru Global Architecture (SGA) platform. All Ascent models feature all-wheel-drive with "X-Mode" as standard equipment, as well as Subaru EyeSight driver assistance technologies.

Models 
The Ascent is the base trim level.

The Ascent Premium is the mid-level trim of the Ascent. It adds a choice of either seven or eight-passenger seating by deleting the second-row bench seat in favor of individual captain's chairs, a  maximum towing capacity, Starlink safety and security features with mobile Wi-Fi capabilities, spill-resistant cloth seating surfaces, blind spot detection (BLIS) with rear cross-path detection, and the All-Weather Package with heated front seats. Optional features include; a power rear liftgate, keyless access with push button start, an auto-dimming rearview mirror, as well as reverse emergency braking under a "Convenience Package". The "Sport Package", which in addition to the features included in the "Convenience Package", adds 20 inch wheels, a panoramic moonroof, navigation, and a cargo area cover, can also be had on the Premium. Either package can be had with either seven or eight-passenger seating.

The Ascent Limited is the "luxury" trim level of the Ascent. It adds leather-trimmed upholstery,  aluminum-alloy wheels, keyless access with push-button start, adaptive front headlamps, reverse automatic braking, and a power rear tailgate. Optional on the Ascent Limited is a "Technology Package" which adds a Harmon-Kardon premium audio system, panoramic moonroof, navigation, and a cargo area cover.

The Ascent Touring is the top-of-the-line Ascent trim level. It adds Java Brown leather-trimmed seating surfaces, second-row captain's chairs with seven-passenger seating, heated and ventilated front seats, rear sunshades, a panoramic power moonroof, and a Harman Kardon premium audio system with 14 speakers and 792 watts of total power.

For the 2022 model year, the Ascent received a new "Onyx Edition" trim level with unique black wheels, badging, and exterior trim. The Onyx edition also receives Subaru's "StarTex" water repellent seat material. The Onyx Edition slots between the Premium and Limited trim levels and receives more standard features over the Premium such as reverse automatic braking, a power rear tailgate, a heated steering wheel, and push button start. A single option package is available for the Onyx edition, which includes a panoramic moonroof, navigation, and a cargo cover.

Model year changes (United States) 
 2020: A new rear seat reminder is made standard across the Ascent lineup, the Premium trim and above gets a one-touch lighting system to turn all the interior lights on or off, the optional rear power liftgate gets a "vehicle lock" button, and new power folding exterior side mirrors are made standard on the top Touring trim. The Warm Ivory interior color is no longer available with the Crimson Red Pearl exterior while the Abyss Blue Pearl exterior gains an optional Slate Black interior color.
 2021: Steering-responsive LED headlights with automatic high beams are made standard on all trim levels. They were previously only standard on the Limited and Touring and were not offered on the lower trim levels. In exterior colors, Tungsten Metallic is replaced by Brilliant Bronze Metallic, the Touring model is now available the Ice Silver Metallic exterior. The adaptive cruise control system was also updated, with lane centering assist instead of the previous lane keep assist. Touring models also received an optional Slate Black interior color, this gave a second interior color choice on the Touring trim which was previously only offered in Java Brown. New self registering TPMS sensors were made standard as well as the second and third row seats receiving seat-belt reminders.
 2022: Introduction of a new Onyx Edition trim level. The Autumn Green Metallic exterior color is introduced, while the Cinnamon Brown Pearl exterior is discontinued. The base "Ascent" trim level receives slightly updated wheels.

Engine 

The Ascent features a newly developed FA24 engine. The cylinder block and heads are made of aluminum alloy, and the heads each have twin overhead camshafts driven by a timing chain.

Features 
The Ascent introduced new technologies that were not currently available in other Subaru models, such as optional mobile Wi-Fi capabilities, and standard EyeSight driver assistance technologies (the system is currently available as an option on other Subaru models).

A suite of new Starlink infotainment systems, first introduced on the 2017 Subaru Impreza, is available on the Ascent. The base system features a seven-inch color touch screen display, standard Apple CarPlay and Android Auto connectivity and SiriusXM Satellite Radio. Available features include integrated GPS navigation provided by TomTom, and an eight-inch color touch screen display.

Reception 
Regarding their experience performing preliminary testing of a development prototype, Motor Trend wrote that mid-range power seemed a bit limited when passing at cruising speed, likely because Subaru has aimed for best-in-class fuel economy for the upcoming Ascent. They also observed the ride was well-damped and the interior was quiet.

The follow-up Motor Trend article stated that the "2.4-liter turbocharged boxer-four proves surprisingly satisfying" and that "the Ascent provides enough motivation for merging onto the highway or passing other vehicles."

Consumer Reports deemed it "the right vehicle for many suburban families".

Safety 

The 2021 Ascent is currently holding the 2020 IIHS Top Safety Pick+.

Awards and recognition 

 2019 Autotrader Best New Cars for 2019 list
 Parents 10 Best Family Cars of 2019
 2021 Kelley Blue Book Lowest 5-Year Cost to Own: Mid-Size – 3-row

Sales

References

External links 

 Official website

Ascent
Cars introduced in 2018
2020s cars
Mid-size sport utility vehicles
Crossover sport utility vehicles
All-wheel-drive vehicles
Flagship vehicles
Cars powered by boxer engines
Motor vehicles manufactured in the United States